Togo is a village in the Canadian province of Saskatchewan within the Rural Municipality of Cote No. 271 and Census Division No. 9.

In 1906, during the Russo-Japanese war, two names stood out: Admiral Togo of the Japanese fleet and Admiral Makaroff of Russia.  In 1906 Pelly Siding was incorporated as a village and renamed Togo after the Japanese admiral, and the next community to the east on the CNR line (5 miles) was named Makaroff (Manitoba) in honour of the Russian admiral.

Despite the small population, Togo has a post office, Lutheran church, curling/skating rink, drop-in centre. Besides farming, local activities include fishing (see: Lake of the Prairies) or playing hockey. There used to be several grain elevators located just off the railway.

NHL player Ted Hampson is from the village. Reginald John Marsden Parker from Togo served as the Lieutenant Governor of Saskatchewan.

Togo station receives Via Rail service. In April 2013, a passenger train derailed near the village. No one was injured.

History 
Togo incorporated as a village on September 4, 1906.

This village was founded after the Japanese had won several victories in the war against Russia (Russo-Japanese War 1904–05). Britain was allied with Japan in this war and Japan was a very popular nation throughout the British Empire. Three towns in Saskatchewan along the CN line (Togo, Kuroki, Mikado), a regional park (Oyama), and CN Siding (Fukushiama) were named in honour of Japanese achievements in this war.

Demographics 

References

External links

Villages in Saskatchewan
Cote No. 271, Saskatchewan
Division No. 9, Saskatchewan
Tōgō Heihachirō